Morpho catenarius is a Neotropical butterfly belonging to the subfamily Morphinae of the family Nymphalidae. It is considered, by some authors, to be a subspecies of Morpho epistrophus.

Description
This species lacks the usual bright blue coloration of many Morpho species. The translucent surfaces of the wings vary from a pale blue color to almost white. The edges of the wings show a series of black spots, while the hindwings are crossed by several small "eyes". Larvae feed on Scutia buxifolia (Rhamnaceae) and other plant species in the families Erythroxylaceae, Leguminosae, Sapindaceae and Euphorbiaceae.

Distribution
This species is found in  Brazil (Minas Gerais, São Paulo).

References
Global Species
Catalogue of Life
"Morpho Fabricius, 1807" at Markku Savela's Lepidoptera and Some Other Life Forms
Paul Smart, 1976 The Illustrated Encyclopedia of the Butterfly World in Color. London, Salamander: Encyclopedie des papillons. Lausanne, Elsevier Sequoia (French language edition)   page 234 fig.3 female form marmorata Fruhstorfer (Brazil)

External links
Butterflies of America Images of type and other specimens of  Morpho epistrophus catenaria
Morpho catenarius
World Field Guide

Morpho